Jazz Samba is a bossa nova album by Stan Getz and Charlie Byrd released by Verve Records in 1962. Jazz Samba signaled the beginning of the bossa nova craze in America. Stan Getz was the featured soloist and the tracks were arranged by Charlie Byrd, who had first heard bossa nova during a tour of Brazil in 1961.

Getz and Byrd were accompanied by two bassists: Keter Betts and Joe Byrd, Charlie Byrd's brother who also played guitar. They were joined by two drummers: Buddy Deppenschmidt and Bill Reichenbach. The album was recorded at All Souls Unitarian Church in Washington, D.C. on February 13, 1962 and released in April of that year.

Two songs, "Desafinado" (Off Key or Out of Tune) and "Samba de Uma Nota Só" (One Note Samba) were composed by Antonio Carlos Jobim and were released as singles in the U.S. and Europe. Charlie Byrd wrote one song, "Samba Dees Days", while the rest were by Brazilian composers.

Stan Getz won the Grammy Award for Best Jazz Performance of 1963 for "Desafinado", and went on to make many other bossa nova recordings, notably with João Gilberto and Astrud Gilberto and the popular song "The Girl from Ipanema". "Desafinado" was also nominated for the Grammy Award for Record of the Year, while Jazz Samba was nominated for the Grammy Award for Album of the Year.

Robert Dimery included Jazz Samba in his book 1001 Albums You Must Hear Before You Die.  The painting on the cover is by Olga Albizu.

Track listing

Side one
 "Desafinado" (Antônio Carlos Jobim, Newton Mendonça) — 5:51
 "Samba Dees Days" (Charlie Byrd) — 3:34
 "O Pato" (Jayme Silva, Neuza Teixeira) — 2:31
 "Samba Triste" (Baden Powell, Billy Blanco) — 4:47

Side two
 "Samba de Uma Nota Só" (Antônio Carlos Jobim, Newton Mendonça) — 6:11
 "É Luxo Só" (Ary Barroso) — 3:40
 "Bahia" (aka 'Baia') (Ary Barroso) — 6:38

Bonus track on CD reissue
 "Desafinado" (Antônio Carlos Jobim, Newton Mendonça) 45 rpm issue — 2:00

Personnel 
 Stan Getz – tenor saxophone
 Charlie Byrd – guitar
 Gene Byrd –  guitar, bass
 Keter Betts – double bass
 Buddy Deppenschmidt – drums, percussion
 Bill Reichenbach Sr. – drums, percussion

Chart positions

References

External links 

 Panel Discussion: The Jazz Samba Project, The Strathmore Music and Arts Center, Bethesda, Md. (2014)
 Chris Richards ( April 19, 2012)  Jazz Samba Turns 50, The Washington Post
 Chris Mc Gowan (4/17/2012) Blame it on the Bossa Nova: Jazz Samba's 50th. Birthday, The Huffington Post

1962 albums
Bossa nova albums
Stan Getz albums
Verve Records albums
Charlie Byrd albums
Albums produced by Creed Taylor
MGM Records albums